Dennis Patrick (born Dennis Patrick Harrison; March 14, 1918 – October 13, 2002) was an American character actor, primarily in television.

Early years
Patrick was born in Philadelphia, Pennsylvania.

Career
Patrick is known for his work in television shows. He portrayed Patrick Chase in the syndicated drama Rituals (1984), Vaughn Leland in CBS's Dallas, Jack Breen in the ABC crime drama Bert D'Angelo/Superstar (1976), and Sergeant Pat O'Dennis in the syndicated comedy The Cliffwood Avenue Kids (1977).

He made four guest appearances on Perry Mason, three of them as the murder victim: Martin Selkirk in the 1959 episode, "The Case of the Deadly Toy", Martin Somers in the 1962 episode, "The Case of the Tarnished Trademark", and golf pro Chick Farley in the 1966 episode, "The Case of the Golfer's Gambit". and as Prosecutor Darryl Teshman in the 1960 episode "The Case of the Prudent Prosecutor".  Among his other television appearances were the roles of Jason McGuire and Paul Stoddard in Dark Shadows, Mac in Somerset, and in such films as The Time Travelers (1964), Daddy's Gone A-Hunting (1969), Joe (1970), Dear Dead Delilah, (1972) and Nightmare Honeymoon (1974). He also was a stage actor, having won the Theater World Award for his starring role in The Wayward Saint. He also portrayed Jean Paul Marat on Broadway in Marat Sade.

Patrick appeared in more than 1,800 guest roles on television programs during his four-decade career, including stints on Tales of Tomorrow (1952), Kraft Theatre (1949–57), Gunsmoke (1958), Playhouse 90 (1958), Sugarfoot (1959), Buckskin (1959), Peter Gunn (1959), U.S. Marshal (1959-1960), 77 Sunset Strip (1960), Bonanza (1960, as Sam Bord in the episode "The Hopefuls"), Wanted: Dead or Alive (1960), Alfred Hitchcock Presents (1960–61); Hawaiian Eye (1962), The Virginian (episode "Big Day, Great Day" 1962), Laramie (1960-1963), Perry Mason (1959-1966), Empire (as Hoot Hinkley in "The Tiger Inside", 1963), The Dakotas (1963), Lost in Space (1966, as Keema "The Golden Man"), The Big Valley (TV series) (1969, as Ed Crawford in "The Battle of Mineral Springs"), Dark Shadows (1967-1970), Emergency! (three episodes, 1972-1975), and Dallas (1979-1984).  Dennis Patrick also appeared in a Barnaby Jones episode titled "Dangerous Summer" (02/11/1975), in Quincy, M.E., (three episodes, 1979–82) and in The Incredible Hulk (as Buck Hendricks, a big game hunter looking to help news reporter Jack McGee capture "The Jolly Green Giant"). He also appeared as Walter Hart in The Rockford Files, season 2, episode 6: "The Great Blue Lake Land and Development Company".

Patrick played Sheriff George Patterson in the film House of Dark Shadows (1970). He was television's first vampire (as Dennis Harrison) in a 1950 episode of Stage 13 (1950).

Personal life
On October 13, 2002, Patrick died next to his pet poodle as fire swept his four-story home in Hollywood Hills, California. He was 84. Patrick was suffering from cancer, needed kidney dialysis, and rarely left the house.

Filmography

References

External links

1918 births
2002 deaths
Male actors from Philadelphia
Male actors from Los Angeles
American male film actors
American male television actors
American male soap opera actors
American people of Irish descent
20th-century American male actors
Accidental deaths in California
Deaths from fire in the United States